Nakajima-Kōen Station (中島公園駅) is a metro station in Chūō-ku, Sapporo, Hokkaido, Japan. The station number is N09.

The station takes its name from the Nakajima Park, located outside the station.

Platforms

Surrounding area
 Nakajima Park
 Sapporo Concert Hall
 Hōheikan building
 Zepp Sapporo
 Central Police Station, Nakajima
 Post Office, Nakajima
 Sapporo Park Hotel
 Kirin Beer Garden
 North Pacific Bank, Nakajima

References

External links

 Sapporo Subway Stations

Railway stations in Japan opened in 1971
Railway stations in Sapporo
Sapporo Municipal Subway
Chūō-ku, Sapporo